Gagino is a rural locality (a village in Sergiyevo-Posadsky District of Moscow Oblast, Russia.

It was first mentioned in 1462 as Timofeyevskoye. Today, it lacks substantial industry, agriculture and infrastructure and has a small population, with most houses used as summer cottages.

The major landmarks and the oldest structures preserved in Gagino are the All-Merciful Savior and Our Lady of Kazan churches with a ravaged and abandoned cemetery aside.

The All-Merciful Savior church is notable for Feodor Chaliapin's wedding, while Our Lady of Kazan church (colloquially called "Kazanskaya") annually serves as an offstage for the Chaliapin festival.

References

External links
Zagorsk.ru Information about Gagino 

Rural localities in Moscow Oblast